The 11th Kisei was the 11th edition of the Kisei tournament. Since Koichi Kobayashi won the previous year, he is given an automatic place in the final. Eleven players battled in a knockout tournament to decide the final 2. Those two would then play each other in a best-of-3 match to decide who would face Kobayashi. Masaki Takemiya became the challenger after beating Hideo Otake 2 games to 1, but he would lose to Kobayashi 4 games to 1 in the final.

Tournament

Challenger finals

Finals 

Kisei (Go)
1987 in go